HD 63744 is a class K0III (orange giant) star in the constellation Puppis. Its apparent magnitude is 4.71 and it is approximately 232 light years away based on parallax.

References

Puppis
K-type giants
Puppis, Q
CD-46 3451
038089
3046
063744